Four regiments of the British Army have been numbered the 75th Regiment of Foot:

75th Regiment of Foot (1758), formed 1758 and disbanded 1763
75th Regiment of Foot (Invalids), renumbered from the 118th in 1763
75th Regiment of Foot (Prince of Wales's Regiment), raised in 1778 and disbanded in 1783
75th (Stirlingshire) Regiment of Foot, raised in 1787, later 1st battalion Gordon Highlanders